Renfrew—Nipissing—Pembroke is a federal electoral district in Ontario, Canada, that has been represented in the House of Commons since 1979.

It is represented by Cheryl Gallant of the Conservative Party.

Renfrew—Nipissing—Pembroke includes all of Renfrew County and a small section of Nipissing District around Algonquin Provincial Park.

The largest community in the riding is the city of Pembroke; other communities include Arnprior, Barry's Bay, Chalk River, Cobden, Deep River, Eganville, Killaloe, Admaston/Bromley, Petawawa and Renfrew.

The riding was a Liberal stronghold both federally and provincially for over half a century; however, a growing religious and agricultural population has turned this district into one of the most conservative areas of Ontario.

Geography

It consists of
 the County of Renfrew; and
 the part of the Territorial District of Nipissing lying south and east of and including the townships of Deacon, Lister, Anglin, Dickson, Preston and Airy.

Political geography
Most of the riding was fairly Conservative from 2004 -2015. In the 2004, 2006, 2008, and 2011 elections, Deep River was the only significant community which voted Liberal. Pikwakanagan, a First Nations reserve, also voted Liberal, and the Township of Wylie had a tie vote. A small handful of polls in Pembroke voted Liberal, but most of the city voted Conservative.

These demographics changed by the 2015 Federal Election, which saw the Liberals hold onto Pikwakanagan and Deep River, and gain most of the polls in Pembroke, Petawawa, and Eganville along with a number in Arnprior, and Renfrew although most of the rural districts voted Conservative.

Demographics
According to the Canada 2011 Census

Ethnic groups: 88.4% White, 9.6% Indigenous, 2.0% Other
Languages: 90.8% English, 4.9% French, 1.1% German, 1.0% Polish, 2.2% Other
Religions: 79.5% Christian, 0.9% Other, 19.6% None
Median income: $29,847 (2010) 
Average income: $37,113 (2010)

History

Renfrew—Nipissing—Pembroke was created in 1976 from parts of Frontenac—Lennox and Addington, Lanark—Renfrew—Carleton and Renfrew North—Nipissing East ridings.

It consisted of the County of Renfrew, excluding the Townships of Bagot and Blythfield and McNab, and the part of the Territorial District of Nipissing including and lying easterly of the Townships of Mattawan, Papineau, Cameron, Deacon, Anglin, Dickson, Preston, Airy and Sabine.

The electoral district was abolished in 1987 when it was redistributed into Renfrew riding. In 1989, Renfrew riding was renamed "Renfrew—Nipissing—Pembroke".

The new riding consisted of the County of Renfrew, and the part of the Territorial District of Nipissing lying east of and including the townships of Deacon and Lister, and east of but excluding the townships of Freswick, Bower and Sproule, and east of and including the townships of Airy and Sabine.

In 1996, the Nipissing part was redefined as being the part of the district lying east of and including the townships of Deacon and Lister, east of and excluding the townships of Freswick, Bower, Sproule and Nightingale, and east of and including the Township of Sabine.

In 2003, it was given its current boundaries as described above.

This riding was unchanged during the 2012 electoral redistribution.

Members of Parliament

This riding has elected the following Members of Parliament:

Election results

Renfrew—Nipissing—Pembroke, 1989 – present

			

Note: Conservative vote is compared to the total of the Canadian Alliance vote and Progressive Conservative vote in 2000 election.

Note: Canadian Alliance vote is compared to the Reform vote in 1997 election.

Renfrew, 1987 – 1989

Renfrew—Nipissing—Pembroke, 1976 – 1987

See also
 List of Canadian federal electoral districts
 Past Canadian electoral districts

References

RENFREW--NIPISSING--PEMBROKE, Ontario (1976 - 1987) Riding history from the Library of Parliament
RENFREW, Ontario (1987 - 1989) Riding history from the Library of Parliament
RENFREW--NIPISSING--PEMBROKE, Ontario (1989 - 2008) Riding history from the Library of Parliament
[Renfrew—Nipissing—Pembroke 2011 results from Elections Canada]
 Campaign expense data from Elections Canada

Notes

External links
 Valley News Net Local media coverage of 2006 election

Ontario federal electoral districts
Pembroke, Ontario